Alvarães may refer to:
 Alvarães, Amazonas
 Alvarães (Viana do Castelo), a parish in Portugal